Richard Elman may refer to:

 Richard Elman (writer) (1934–1997), American novelist, poet, journalist, and teacher
 Richard Elman (mathematician) (born 1945), American mathematician known for his work in algebra
 Richard Samuel Elman (born 1940), British businessman

See also
 Richard Ellmann (1918–1987), American literary critic and biographer